St Gerard's  can apply to a number of things/places etc.

Something belonging to a Saint Gerard
St. Gerard Majella Catholic Church in Carlingford, Sydney, Australia
St Gerard's Church and Monastery in Wellington, New Zealand
St Gerard's School in Bray, Ireland
St. Gerard School, Saskatoon
St. Gerard Catholic High School in San Antonio, Texas
St. Gerard's RC Secondary, Govan in Glasgow, United Kingdom